Neftchala District is one of the 66 districts of Azerbaijan. It is located in the south-east of the country and belongs to the Shirvan-Salyan Economic Region. The district borders the districts of Jalilabad, Bilasuvar, Salyan, Lankaran, and Masally. Its capital and largest city is Neftchala. As of 2020, the district had a population of 88,900.

History 
The Neftchala District was formed as a district in the composition of the Azerbaijan Soviet Socialist Republic on February 11, 1940. Until this time it was located in the area of modern Salyan District, and during that year it became part of the Khilly region, organized on January 24, 1939. As  Neftchala was an exceptionally industrial region, it was liquidated in December 1959 and unified with the Salyan region. However, after 4 years it was split off from the Salyan District again and became a separate industrial zone. But it was felt that this mixed system for control did not justify itself, and once again Neftchala region was liquidated in 1965 and became part of the Salyan. The region was finally made separate again after 7 years on April 27, 1973.

Territory 
There is one city (Neftchala), 48 villages, and 3 settlements (Banke, Khylly, and Hasanabad) in the district.  Neftchala district is bordered with Masally, Salyan, Jelilabad, Bilesuvar, and Lankaran.

The total area of the district is 1,451 km 2. 825 km 2 of this territory is productive lands. Agricultural lands cover 390 km 2 of the territory. Cattle – breeding pastures occupy 355 km 2 area, while the total area of planted lands is 470 km 2. Fruit gardens and saline lands cover 5 km 2 and 13 km 2 areas respectively.

Population

Geography and climate 
The territory of the district is mainly lowland. The district is situated 22 meters lower than sea level. Shirvan and Mugan Lowlands covers the south-east of the district. The river Kura flows into the Caspian Sea in Neftchala district. There are mud volcanos that occupy the area from Baligchi to Gizilagaj bay. There are several underwater plains in the coastal area of the Neftchala district. They are Karagedov, Kalmichkov, Kur, Borisov, Kornilov-Pavlov, Plita, Pogorelaya, and Golovachev. There is a lake named Duzdag, which is situated between Babazanan and Durovdag peaks, on the border of the Salyan district.

The district has a semi-desert and warm climate. The average temperature is 3C in January and 25-36 C in July.

Flora and fauna 
Lands of the district are divided as grey-meadow, alluvial meadow, and swampy meadow. There are saline soils as well. Vegetation in the district is semi-desert and desert type. There can be found Tugay forests.

District's fauna is diverse. The dominant fauna of the Neftchala district includes gazelle, pelican, boar, wolf, wild cat, rabbit and such.

Economy 
Khazar is an automobile factory belonging to Azermash Company located in Neftchala, Azerbaijan.

Agriculture, fishing, oil, and gas are the cores of the district economy.

Municipalities 
There are 17 municipalities in the district which consist of 163 members. Neftchala municipality has 15 members, Khylly municipality has 9, Hasanabad municipality has 11, and other village municipalities have 128 members. The municipalities of Neftchala district are situated in the city, with two settlements, and 14 villages.

Court 
The court was established on 20 April 1974. The initial name of the court was Neftchala District People's Court. Its name was changed to Neftchala District Court in 2000.

Notable natives 
 Khalil Rza Uluturk, writer

References 

 
Districts of Azerbaijan